is a 1998 Japanese horror film directed by Ataru Oikawa. It is the first film in the Tomie film series, based on a manga of the same name by Junji Ito.

Plot
In Japan, the police investigate the murder of high school girl Tomie Kawakami (Miho Kanno). They learn that in the months following the crime, nine students and one teacher have either committed suicide or gone insane. The detective (Tomoro Taguchi)  assigned to the case learns that three years prior another Tomie Kawakami was murdered in rural Gifu prefecture. Other slain Tomie Kawakamis are discovered stretching all the way back to the 1860s, right when Japan began to modernize. The detective tracks down one of Tomie's classmates called Tsukiko Izumisawa (Mami Nakamura), an art student who is being treated for amnesia. She has absolutely no memory of the three-month period around Tomie's death, and is starting to suspect the cause has a supernatural source. Meanwhile, Tsukiko's neighbor is rearing a peculiar baby-like creature. Over the span of a couple weeks, it grows into a beautiful teenaged girl with orange eyes responding to the name of Tomie Kawakami.

Soon afterwards, Tomie begins seducing Tsukiko's boyfriend Yuuichi (Kouta Kusano). Meanwhile, Tsukiko enters her new neighbor's apartment to investigate. Upon discovering her friend's dead body, she is attacked by her landlord and passes out due to asphyxiation. She wakes up in her psychiatrist's office and encounters Tomie. Tomie starts emotionally taunting Tsukiko, taking unflattering selfies and pictures with and of her, and attempting to feed her live cockroaches. Soon thereafter, Yuuichi arrived on the scene and murders Tomie. As they go bury Tomie's headless body in the woods, she comes back to life and Tsukiko runs off further into the woods and finds herself on a boat dock. Tomie then appears once again, now fully regenerated, and kisses Tsukiko on the lips. They both begin laughing as Tsukiko lights a flare and sets Tomie on fire.

Tsukiko is now shown leading a normal life, still taking photographs and being interested in art. One day as she goes to develop a picture she took of herself, she notices a mole under her left eye she didn't have before; the same kind of mole Tomie had. Tsukiko then looks at herself in the mirror in shock as Tomie appears, smiling.

Cast
 Mami Nakamura – Tsukiko Izumisawa
 Miho Kanno – Tomie Kawakami
 Yoriko Douguchi – Dr. Hosono
 Tomorowo Taguchi – Detective Harada
 Kenji Mizuhashi – Kenichi Yamamoto
 Rumi – Kaori

Production

Director Ataru Oikawa admired the original manga for Tomie, referring to it as a "fairy tale in bad taste". Opposed to a shocking and gorey film, Oikawa desired to make a film he described as not one "where people scream with fear. I didn't imagine that kind of horror movie. I wanted this to be more like a drama for youth." As the comic contained graphic violence, Oikawa decided that he would work from a clean slate while still seeking seek manga author Junji Ito's approval and input. Oikawa's script draws characters and situations from the stories "Photograph" and Kiss" in Ito's original manga, although not "Mansion," which also features Tsukiko as the protagonist. The film acts like a sequel to the manga taking place several years after the original story.

For the role of Tomie, Miho Kanno was chosen specifically by manga author Junji Ito for the role. The film's score was composed by Hiroshi Futami and Toshihiro Kimura while the film contains a theme song from Japanese pop act World Famous.

Release
Tomie was released in Japan on October 6, 1998. It was released on DVD by Adness on February 3, 2004.

Reception

Reception to the film was mostly mixed, however it did garner popularity in Japan and some other countries as well. Video Watchdog, in their review of Tomie, stated that it was "too mild and slow-going though it is attractively photographed." However, the review positively reacted to Kanno's performance as Tomie, stating that "Ms. Kanno, with her soulless eyes and utterly creepy smile, remains the quintessential Tomie."

The film spawned a film series, including a prequel, and Kanno became known for her performance as Tomie, reprising it in one of the film's sequels Tomie: Unlimited, and remaining the face of the Tomie film series and the most popular film incarnation of the character.

Aftermath and influence
After the release of Tomie, the first sequel was not a theatrical film but a direct-to-video release of Tomie: Another Face released on October 25, 1999. The next theatrical Tomie film was Tomie: Replay that was released on the bottom half of a double bill with Uzumaki on February 11, 2000. In 2005, the film Tomie: Beginning was released as a prequel adapted faithfully from the original manga. Tomie: Beginning ends where Tomie begins.

Notes

References

External links
 
 Review at SaruDama

1998 films
1998 horror films
Films directed by Ataru Oikawa
Japanese horror films
Live-action films based on manga
Fiction about murder
Tomie (film series)
1990s Japanese films